"Nite Flights" is a song by the American singer-songwriter  Scott Walker under his given name Scott Engel. It was first recorded and released by Walker's pop group The Walker Brothers as the title track of their final album, 1978's Nite Flights.

Personnel
 John Walker and Scott Walker - Vocals
 Dave MacRae - Keyboards
 Frank Gibson - Drums
 Mo Foster and Scott Walker - Basses
 The Walker Brothers - Arrangements
 Dave MacRae - Orchestrations and Conductor
 Scott Walker and Dave MacRae - Producer
 Dennis Weinreich - Recording
 Scott Walker, Dave MacRae and Dennis Weinreich - Mixing

David Bowie version
"Nite Flights" was first covered by the English musician David Bowie in 1993 for his album Black Tie White Noise. Along with all the other songs on Black Tie White Noise, this version uses heavy electronic sounds, including electronic drums and multiple synthesizers.

Bowie remarked that he was introduced to Scott Walker when he dated one of Walker's ex-girlfriends. Reportedly, she enjoyed Walker's music more than Bowie's, and played Walker's albums constantly.

A live performance of the song from a 1995 show during Bowie's Outside Tour was included on the release Ouvrez le Chien (Live Dallas 95) (2020).

Versions
 Album version - 4:30
 Moodswings Back to Basics Remix – 10:01

The Fatima Mansions cover

"Nite Flights" was recorded by the art rock group The Fatima Mansions in 1994 for their album Lost in the Former West. It was also released as a single on UK Radioactive/Kitchenware the same year. The single also included a remix of the song by The Blood Of The Lamb titled "It's So Cold.... I Think".

Track listing

Other sources
 Black Tie White Noise Limited Edition DVD (2004)
 The Trouser Press

References

1978 songs
1994 singles
The Walker Brothers songs
David Bowie songs
The Fatima Mansions songs
Songs written by Scott Walker (singer)
GTO Records singles